The Davis Cup is the premier international team event in men's tennis. It is run by the International Tennis Federation (ITF) and is contested annually between teams from over 140 competing countries. It is described by the organisers as the "World Cup of Tennis", and the winners are referred to as the World Champions. The competition began in 1900 as a challenge between Great Britain and the United States. By 2023, 155 nations entered teams into the competition.

The most successful countries over the history of the tournament are the United States (winning 32 titles and finishing as runners-up 29 times) and Australia (winning 28 titles, including six with New Zealand as Australasia, and finishing as runners-up 19 times). The current champions are Canada, who beat Australia to win their first title in 2022.

The women's equivalent of the Davis Cup is the Billie Jean King Cup, formerly known as the Fed Cup. Australia, Russia, the Czech Republic, and the United States are the only countries to have won both Davis Cup and Fed Cup titles in the same year.

The Davis Cup allowed only amateurs and national registered professional players (from 1968) to compete until 1973, five years after the start of the Open Era.

, Russia and Belarus are suspended due to the Russian invasion of Ukraine.

History

The idea for a tournament pitting the best British and Americans in competition against one another was probably first conceived by James Dwight, the first president of the U.S. National Lawn Tennis Association when it formed in 1881. Desperate to assess the development of American players against the renowned British champions, he worked tirelessly to engage British officials in a properly sanctioned match, but failed to do so. He nevertheless tried to entice top international (particularly British) talent to the U.S. and sanctioned semi-official tours of the top American players to Great Britain. Diplomatic relations between Great Britain and the United States on the tennis front had strengthened such that, by the mid-1890s, reciprocal tours were staged annually between players of the two nations, and an ensuing friendship between American William Larned and Irishman Harold Mahony spurred efforts to formalize an official team competition between the two nations.

International competitions had been staged for some time before the first Davis Cup match in 1900. From 1892, England and Ireland had been competing in an annual national-team-based competition, similar to what would become the standard Davis Cup format, mixing single and doubles matches, and in 1895 England played against France in a national team competition. During Larned's tour of the British Isles in 1896, where he competed in several tournaments including the Wimbledon Championships, he was also a spectator for the annual England vs. Ireland match.

He returned to exclaim that Britain had agreed to send a group of three to the U.S. the following summer, which would represent the first British lawn tennis "team" to compete in the U.S. Coincidentally, some weeks before Larned left for his British tour, the idea for an international competition was discussed also between leading figures in American lawn tennis—one of whom was tennis journalist E.P. Fischer—at a tournament in Niagara-on-the-Lake, Ontario.

Dwight F. Davis was in attendance at this tournament, and was thought to have got wind of the idea as it was discussed in the tournament's popular magazine, and Davis's name was mentioned as someone who might 'do something for the game ... put up some big prize, or cup'. Larned and Fischer met on several occasions that summer and discussed the idea of an international match to be held in Chicago the following summer, pitting six of the best British players against six of the best Americans, in a mixture of singles and doubles matches. This was discussed openly in two articles in the Chicago Tribune, but did not come to fruition.

Nevertheless, the following summer, Great Britain—though not under the official auspices of the Lawn Tennis Association—sent three of its best players to compete in several US tournaments. Their relative poor performances convinced Dwight and other leading officials and figures in American lawn tennis that the time was right for a properly sanctioned international competition. This was to be staged in Newcastle in July 1898, but the event never took place as the Americans could not field a sufficiently strong team. A reciprocal tour to the U.S. in 1899 amounted to just a single British player travelling overseas, as many of the players were involved in overseas armed conflicts.

It was at this juncture, in the summer of 1899, that four members of the Harvard University tennis team—Dwight Davis included—travelled across the States to challenge the best west-coast talent, and upon his return, it apparently occurred to Davis that if teams representing regions could arouse such great feelings, then why wouldn't a tennis event that pitted national teams in competition be just as successful. He approached James Dwight with the idea, which was tentatively agreed, and he ordered an appropriate sterling silver punchbowl trophy from Shreve, Crump & Low, purchasing it from his own funds for about US$1,000. They in turn commissioned a classically styled design from William B. Durgin's of Concord, New Hampshire, crafted by the Englishman Rowland Rhodes.

Beyond donating a trophy for the competition, Davis's involvement in the incipient development of the tournament that came to bear his name was negligible, yet a persistent myth has emerged that Davis devised both the idea for an international tennis competition and its format of mixing singles and doubles matches. Research has shown this to be a myth, similar in its exaggeration of a single individual's efforts within a highly complex long-term development to the myths of William Webb Ellis and Abner Doubleday, who have both been wrongly credited with inventing rugby and baseball, respectively. Davis nevertheless went on to become a prominent politician in the United States in the 1920s, serving as US Secretary of War from 1925 to 1929 and as Governor-General of the Philippines from 1929 to 1932.

The first match, between the United States and Britain (competing as the "British Isles"), was held at the Longwood Cricket Club in Boston, Massachusetts in 1900. The American team, of which Dwight Davis was captain, surprised the British by winning the first three matches. The following year the two countries did not compete, but the US won the match in 1902 and Britain won the following four matches. By 1905 the tournament expanded to include Belgium, Austria, France, and Australasia, a combined team from Australia and New Zealand that competed together until 1914.

The tournament was initially titled the International Lawn Tennis Challenge although it soon became known as the Davis Cup, after Dwight Davis' trophy. The Davis Cup competition was initially played as a challenge cup. All teams competed against one another for the right to face the previous year's champion in the final round.

Beginning in 1923, the world's teams were split into two zones: the "America Zone" and the "Europe Zone". The winners of the two zones met in the Inter-Zonal Zone ("INZ") to decide which national team would challenge the defending champion for the cup. In 1955 a third zone, the "Eastern Zone", was added. Because there were three zones, the winner of one of the three zones received a bye in the first round of the INZ challenger rounds. In 1966, the "Europe Zone" was split into two zones, "Europe Zone A" and "Europe Zone B", so the winners of the four zones competed in the INZ challenger rounds.

From 1950 to 1967, Australia dominated the competition, winning the Cup 15 times in 18 years.

Beginning in 1972, the format was changed to a knockout tournament, so that the defending champion was required to compete in all rounds, and the Davis Cup was awarded to the tournament champion.

Up until 1973, the Davis Cup had only ever been won by the United States, Great Britain/British Isles, France and Australia/Australasia. Their domination was eventually broken in 1974 when South Africa and India made the final; however, the final was scratched and South Africa awarded the cup after India refused to travel to South Africa in protest of South Africa's apartheid policies. The following year saw the first actual final between two "outsider" nations, when Sweden beat Czechoslovakia 3–2, and since then, many other countries have gone on to capture the trophy.

All contract professionals were not allowed to play in the Davis Cup until 1973. The tennis stars who turned professional prior to the Open Era (pre-1968) were not allowed to compete in the Davis Cup despite the fact that the Grand Slam tournaments and most tennis tournaments became Open Era events in 1968. From 1968 national registered professionals were allowed to compete under the control of their national tennis associations. In 1973 Australian players like Rod Laver and Ken Rosewall were allowed to play in the Davis Cup for the first time since 1962 (for Laver) and since 1956 (for Rosewall).

In 1981, a tiered system of competition was created, in which the 16 best national teams compete in the World Group and all other national teams compete in one of four groups in one of three regional zones. In 1989, the tiebreak was introduced into Davis Cup competition, and from 2016 it is used in all five sets.

In 2018, the ITF voted to change the format of the competition from 2019 onwards, changing it to an 18-team event to happen at the end of the season, with 71% of ITF member federations voting in favour of the change. The new format, backed by footballer Gerard Piqué and Japanese businessman Hiroshi Mikitani, was likened to a world cup of tennis and was designed to be more attractive to sponsors and broadcasters. Opposing federations included those from Australia, Germany, and Great Britain. Support for the reform was also mixed among current and former players, with some such as Novak Djokovic and Rafael Nadal being in favour of the new format, but others such as Rod Laver, Lucas Pouille and Roger Federer being opposed. On 12th January 2023, the ITF announced that the partnership with the new promoter ends and that ITF is taking back the control of the event. 

Davis Cup games have been affected by political protests several times, especially in Sweden:
 The match between Sweden and Rhodesia 1968 was supposed to be played in Båstad but was moved to Bandol, France, due to protests against the Rhodesian white minority government of Ian Smith.
 The Swedish government tried to stop the match between Chile and Sweden in 1975 in Båstad, due to violations of human rights in Chile. The match was played, even while 7,000 people protested against it outside.
 After the 2008–2009 Israel–Gaza conflict, 6,000 people protested against Israel outside the Malmö city Davis Cup match between Sweden and Israel in March 2009. The Malmö Municipality politicians were concerned about extremists, and decided due to security reasons to only let a small audience in.

Russia and Belarus were suspended after the 2022 Russian invasion of Ukraine.

Format

Tournament
The 18 best national teams are assigned to the World Group and compete annually for the Davis Cup. Nations which are not in the World Group compete in one of three regional zones (Americas, Asia/Oceania, and Europe/Africa). The competition is spread over four weekends during the year. Each elimination round between competing nations is held in one of the countries, and is played as the best of five matches (4 singles, 1 doubles). The ITF determines the host countries for all possible matchups before each year's tournament.

The World Group is the top group and includes the world's best 18 national teams. Teams in the World Group play a four-round elimination tournament. Teams are seeded based on a ranking system released by the ITF, taking into account previous years' results. The defending champion and runner-up are always the top two seeds in the tournament. The losers of the first-round matches are sent to the World Group playoff round, where they play along with winners from Group I of the regional zones. The playoff round winners play in the World Group for the next year's tournament, while the losers play in Group I of their respective regional zone.

Each of the three regional zones is divided into four groups. Groups I and II play elimination rounds, with the losing teams facing relegation to the next-lower group. The teams in Groups III and those in Group IV play a round-robin tournament with promotion and relegation.

2019 modifications
For the 2019 edition, the format of the cup is changed. The main modification is the World Group taking place at one location and in one week, with eighteen teams divided in six round-robin groups of three teams each, with the winners of the groups and the two best second places advancing to quarterfinals. The series between the teams in this stage will feature two singles matches and one doubles match, instead of the best-of-5 series, with the matches changing from best of 5 sets to best of 3. As the World Group will now take place as one single tournament, this event has been named as the Davis Cup Finals. The lower zone groups I and II will be composed of single ties deciding promotion or relegation.

Structure 

Note: The total number of nations in Group One is 24. However, the distribution among the three zones may vary each year, according to the number of nations promoted or relegated between Group One and the World Group. The number of nations in the World Group and Group One together is 22 from Euro/Africa Zone, 9 from Americas Zone and 9 from Asia/Oceania Zone.

Ties and rubbers
As in other cup competitions tie is used in the Davis Cup to mean an elimination round. In the Davis Cup, the word rubber means an individual match.

In the annual World Group competition, 16 nations compete in eight first-round ties; the eight winners compete in four quarterfinal ties; the four winners compete in two semifinal ties; and the two winners compete in the final tie.

Each tie consists of five rubbers, which are played in three days (usually on Friday, Saturday, and Sunday). The winner of the tie is the nation which wins three or more of the five rubbers in the tie. On the first day, the first two rubbers are singles, which are generally played by each nation's two best available singles players. On the second day, the doubles rubber is played. On the third day, the final two rubbers are typically reverse singles, in which the first-day contestants usually play again, but they swap opponents from the first day's singles rubbers. However, in certain circumstances, the team captain may replace one or two of the players who played the singles on Friday by other players who were nominated for the tie. For example, if the tie has already been decided in favour of one of the teams, it is common for younger or lower-ranked team members to play the remaining dead rubbers in order for them to gain Davis Cup experience.

Since 2011, if a nation has a winning 3–1 lead after the first reverse single match and that match has gone to four sets or more, then the remaining reverse single match which is a dead rubber is not played. All five rubbers are played if one nation has a winning 3–0 lead after the doubles match.

Ties are played at a venue chosen by one of the competing countries. The right of choice is given on an alternating basis. Therefore, countries play in the country where the last tie between the teams was not held. In case the two countries have not met since 1970, lots are drawn to determine the host country.

Venues in the World Group must comply with certain minimum standards, including a minimum seating capacity as follows:
 World Group play-offs: 4,000
 World Group first round: 4,000
 World Group quarterfinals: 6,000
 World Group semifinals: 8,000
 World Group final: 12,000

Captain
Prior to each tie, the captain (non-playing coach appointed by the national association) nominates a squad of four players and decides who will compete in the tie. On the day before play starts, the order of play for the first day is drawn at random. In the past, teams could substitute final day singles players only in case of injury or illness, verified by a doctor, but current rules permit the captain to designate any player to play the last two singles rubbers, provided that no first day matchup is repeated. There is no restriction on which of the playing team members may play the doubles rubber: the two singles players, two other players (usually doubles specialists) or a combination.

Each rubber is normally played as best of five sets. Since 2016, all sets use a tiebreak at 6–6 if necessary (formerly, the fifth set usually had no tiebreaker, so play continued until one side won by two games e.g. 10–8). However, if a team has clinched the tie before all five rubbers have been completed, the remaining rubbers may be shortened to best of three sets, with a tiebreak if necessary to decide all three sets.

In Group III and Group IV competitions, each tie consists only of three rubbers, which include two singles and one doubles rubber, which is played in a single day. The rubbers are in the best of three sets format, with a tie breaker if necessary to decide all three sets.

Records and statistics

Performance by team

Titles by country (since 1972)

 Consecutive titles
 All-time: 7, United States, 1920–1926
 Post-Challenge Round: 2; United States, 1978–79, 1981–82; Sweden, 1984–85, 1997–98; West Germany, 1988–89; Spain, 2008–09; Czech Republic, 2012–13
 Consecutive finals appearances
 All-time: 23, Australia, 1946–1968
 Post-Challenge Round: 7, Sweden, 1983–1989
 Most games in a tie
 All-time: 327, India 3–2 Australia, 1974 Eastern Zone final
 World Group (before tiebreak): 281, Paraguay 3–2 France, 1985 first round
 World Group (since tiebreak): 281, Romania 3–2 Ecuador, 2003 World Group play-offs

Years in World Group

 USA 37
 Czech Republic 36
 France 36
 Germany 35
 Spain 32
 Australia 31
 Sweden 31
 Italy 27
 Switzerland 27
 Russia 26
 Argentina 25
 Belgium 20
 Netherlands 19
 Austria 17
 Great Britain 17
 Croatia 16
 Romania 14
 Brazil 13
 India 13
 Serbia 11
 Canada 10
 Israel 10
 Mexico 10
 Chile 9
 Denmark 9
 Japan 8
 New Zealand 8
 Kazakhstan 7
 Paraguay 7
 Slovakia 7
 South Korea 5
 Ecuador 5
 Belarus 4
 South Africa 4
 Hungary 3
 Morocco 3
 Zimbabwe 3
 Indonesia 2
 Cuba 1
 Ireland 1
 Peru 1
 Poland 1

Most wins in World Group

Results by nation

World Group 
(1981–2018)

Finals

Individual
 Most titles as a player;
 Roy Emerson; Australia; 8 titles (1959, 1960, 1961, 1962, 1964, 1965, 1966, 1967)
 Most titles as captain;
 Harry Hopman; Australia; 16 titles (1939, 1950, 1951, 1952, 1953, 1955, 1956, 1957, 1959, 1960, 1961, 1962, 1964, 1965, 1966, 1967)
 Youngest player
 Marco De Rossi; San Marino; 13 years, 319 days (12 May 2011)

 Oldest player
 Vittorio Pellandra; San Marino; 66 years, 104 days (11 May 2007)
 Most years played
 30, Leander Paes, India (1990–2010, 2012–2020)
 Most ties played
 93, Domenico Vicini, San Marino (1993–2015)
 Most rubbers played
 164, Nicola Pietrangeli, Italy (1954–1972)
 Most rubbers won
 Total: 120, Nicola Pietrangeli, Italy
 Singles: 78, Nicola Pietrangeli, Italy
 Doubles: 45, Leander Paes, India

Current ITF Davis Cup ranking
For more information, see ITF rankings

†

Broadcasters

See also 

 Junior Davis Cup and Junior Billie Jean King Cup
 List of Davis Cup champions
 Billie Jean King Cup
 ATP Cup
 Hopman Cup
 Davis Cup Tennis, a video game based on the event
 History of tennis

References

External links

 Official website
 Davis Cup live streaming website
 Davis Cup 2019 TV Channels Rights 

 
World cups
Men's tennis tournaments
Recurring sporting events established in 1900
World championships in racquet sports
Annual sporting events
International men's tennis team competitions